This is a list of wars involving the Republic of the Congo.

References

 
Congo, Republic of the
Wars